The Lobor concentration camp or Loborgrad camp was a concentration camp established in Lobor, Independent State of Croatia (modern-day Croatia) in the deserted palace of Keglevich family. It was established on 9 August 1941, mostly for Serb and Jewish children and women. The camp was established and operated by Ustaše, with 16 of its guards being members of the local Volksdeutsche community. Its inmates were subjected to systematic torture, robbery and murder of "undisciplined" individuals. All younger female inmates of the Lobor camp were subjected to rapes. More than 2,000 people were inmates of this camp, at least 200 died in it. All survived children and women were transported to Auschwitz concentration camp in August 1942 where they all were killed.

Establishment 
The Lobor concentration camp was established on 9 August 1942, mostly for Serb and Jewish children and women. The camp was established in the deserted palace of Keglevich family. It was established, operated and controlled by Ustasha Surveillance Service subordinated to Main Ustaša Headquarters, the guards were members of the German ethnic community (Volksdeutsche), totally 16 of them. The maximum capacity of this camp was 800 inmates.

The inmates 
Because of the significant proportion of children among its inmates, this camp was categorized among children's concentration camp, besides Jablanac, Mlaka, Bročica brickyard, Uštica, Sisak, Jastrebarsko and Gornja Rijeka. According to some sources, the total number of children inmates in concentration camps in Croatia in 1942 was at least 24,000. The first contingent of inmates numbering 1,300 people was transported to Lobor camp from Kruščica concentration camp. The number of women and children inmates in Lobor camp reached 1,500. All younger female inmates of the Lobor camp were subjected to rapes by the commanding officers and guards, which resulted with pregnancies, in some cases even of 14 years old girls. Besides systematic rapes, the inmates were subjected to torture, robbery and murder of "undisciplined" individuals. At least 200 women and children died in Lobor camp. There was no mass killing of inmates in Lobor, 150 inmates died because of typhoid epidemy.

Around 2,000 Jewish women and children were inmates of this concentration camp during its existence. In period between 13 and 28 August 1942 all survived children and women were transported to Auschwitz concentration camp where they all were killed.

Aftermath 
In 2002 the Home for Mentally lll Adults Lobor-Grad was established in the object which housed the camp. According to its website, during the World War II its building was the almshouse of The Society for the Suppression of begging and supporting sick.

References

Sources

Further reading 
 

Concentration camps of the Independent State of Croatia
Jewish Croatian history
The Holocaust in Yugoslavia
History of the Serbs of Croatia